Harfa is a Syrian village in the Qatana District of the Rif Dimashq Governorate. According to the Syria Central Bureau of Statistics (CBS), Harfa had a population of 2,362 in the 2004 census. Its inhabitants are predominantly Druze.

References

External links

Druze communities in Syria
Populated places in Qatana District